HFSS or HfSS may refer to:
 high-frequency structure simulator, a high frequency electromagnetic simulation software, see Ansys HFSS
 high in fat, sugar and salt, food products that are high in fat, sugar or salt, see junk food
 Hochschule für Sozialpädagogik und Sozialökonomie, a predecessor of the City University of Applied Sciences in Bremen, Germany